Alex Edmans is professor of finance at London Business School and the current Mercers' School Memorial Professor of Business at Gresham College. Since 2017 he has been the Managing Editor of the Review of Finance, the leading academic finance journal in Europe. He gave the TED talk What to Trust in a Post-Truth World, on confirmation bias and the importance of being discerning with evidence. In 2021 he was named Professor of the Year by Poets & Quants.

Education and early career 

Edmans received a BA from Merton College, Oxford and a PhD from MIT Sloan School of Management as a Fulbright scholar. After two stints at Morgan Stanley, his first academic position was at Wharton School of the University of Pennsylvania. He was awarded tenure in 2013 and then moved to London Business School as a full professor of finance.

Research 

Edmans' research is on corporate governance, executive pay, responsible business, and behavioral finance, and has been cited over 14,500 times. His work covers topics such as the role of blockholders (large shareholders) in disciplining management, the importance of long horizons in executive pay, the link between employee satisfaction and long-term stock returns, and the effect of sentiment on the stock market. His most recent research is on the business case for responsible business, demonstrating that responsibility can create financial as well as social value.

He is the co-author of Principles of Corporate Finance, the leading corporate finance textbook (with Richard Brealey, Stewart Myers, and Franklin Allen) from the 14th edition.

Books
Grow the Pie: How Great Companies Deliver Both Purpose and Profit, Cambridge University Press, 2020 
Principles of Corporate Finance, 14th edition, McGraw-Hill, 2022

References

Year of birth missing (living people)
Living people
Academics of London Business School
Professors of Gresham College